A referendum on a new constitution was held in Morocco on 7 December 1962. It was the first national-level vote in the country, and only the second election ever following local elections in 1960. Despite only being announced on 18 November, and facing a boycott campaign from the National Union of Popular Forces, voter turnout was 84.2%, with 97% voting in favour of the new constitution. The first parliamentary elections took place the following year.

Results

References

1962 referendums
1962
1962 in Morocco
Constitutional referendums in Morocco